We, the Weapon is the second full-length release by Canadian rock band Alert the Medic. The album was Produced, Recorded and Mixed by Laurence Currie. We, the Weapon was recorded between Toronto, Ontario and Halifax, Nova Scotia at Halla Music, Greendoor Studios, Sunnyside Studios, The Echo Chamber and Studio 313 in the Spring of 2009 and was mastered by Noah Mintz at the Lacquer Channel in Toronto. Additional recordings were done by Charles Austin, Dave Ewenson and Ryan MacDonald. It was released independently on September 19, 2009.

Track listing
 "Atlas" - 4:21
 "Cause For Alarm" - 3:38
 "Let's Hear It For The Symphony" - 3:36
 "Cardboard Cutout" - 3:31
 "The Weatherman (PT. 2)" - 4:37
 "Aid The Getaway" - 2:44
 "Hey, Kid To The Back Of The Line" - 3:59
 "Stealing Scenery" - 3:02
 "The Tortoise And The Hare" - 4:02
 "Cross Your Fingers" - 4:00
 "The Wound That Wont Heal" - 5:15

Personnel
 Ryan MacDonald - Vocals, Guitar, Keyboard
 Matt Campbell - Bass guitar, Vocals
 Dale Wilson - Drums, Percussion, Vocals
 Troy Arseneault - Guitar, Vocals

With
 Rob Crowell - Keyboard on Track 1,2,5,7,8,9,10,11
 Scott Long - Bagpipes on Track 10
 Brad MacDonald - Group Vocals on Track 3,7,10

Art
 Jud Haynes - Art Direction and Layout
 Chr!s Sm!th - Band Photo

References

2009 albums
Alert the Medic albums